C. V. Rajendran (12 March 1937 – 1 April 2018) was an Indian film director and producer who worked in the Tamil, Telugu, Malayalam, Kannada and Hindi film industries. He was a cousin of famous director C. V. Sridhar.

Film career
He worked with C. V. Sridhar as assistant and associate director and gained experience and the knowledge of successful filmmaking and started his own career. He introduced Sivaji Ganesan's son Prabhu as an actor through the film Sangili.

Death
Rajendran died on April 1, 2018, at the age of 81 due to health issues at MIOT Hospital.

Partial filmography

As director
Films

Serials
Kurinji Malar (DD Podhigai)
Kokila Enge Pogiraal (Sun TV)
Naalavathu Mudichu - Jaya TV

As producer

References

External links 

1937 births
2018 deaths
Tamil film directors
Kannada film directors
Place of birth missing
Telugu film directors
Malayalam film directors
20th-century Indian film directors
Tamil film producers
People from Kanchipuram district